Alejandro "Álex" Prendes Reina (born 12 April 1997) is a Spanish footballer who plays for Barakaldo CF as a central defender.

Club career
Born in Avilés, Asturias, Prendes joined Real Oviedo's youth setup in 2015, from Veriña CF. He made his senior debut with the reserves during the 2015–16 campaign, in Tercera División.

Prendes made his first team debut on 6 September 2017, starting in a 0–1 home loss against CD Numancia, for the season's Copa del Rey. He continued to appear exclusively with the B's, however.

In July 2019, Prendes moved to another reserve team, UD Almería B in the fourth tier.

References

External links

1997 births
Living people
People from Avilés
Spanish footballers
Footballers from Asturias
Association football defenders
Segunda División B players
Tercera División players
Real Oviedo Vetusta players
Real Oviedo players
UD Almería B players
Gimnástica de Torrelavega footballers
Barakaldo CF footballers